Elections to Vale of White Horse District Council were held on 6 May 1999. The whole council was up for election and the Liberal Democrats stayed in overall control. The next full council elections took place on 1 May 2003.

Election result

|}

References

1999
1999 English local elections
20th century in Oxfordshire